Kilmacud is a stop on the Luas light-rail tram system in Dún Laoghaire - Rathdown, south of Dublin, Ireland.  It opened in 2004 as a stop on the Green Line and serves the eponymous suburb.  The stop is located at the junction between Benildus Avenue and Drummartin Link Road.

Location and access

The track around Kilmacud runs in a broad cutting between  Benildus Avenue and the grounds of St Benildus College. A footbridge provides access across the tracks, avoiding the stop completely. The stop has entrances on both sides, leading from the northbound platform to Benildus Avenue, and from the southbound platform to a footpath in the college (which ultimately leads to Drummartin link road). Both entrances consist of a staircase and lift to provide step-free access.  The Benildus Avenue entrance then has a bridge over the side of the cutting, leading to a gap in the retaining wall. At the road junction, the Luas stop is identified with a solar-powered totem of the same design to one seen at Carrickmines.

The stop is also served by Dublin Bus route 63.

References

Luas Green Line stops in Dún Laoghaire–Rathdown